Jacob Johann Köhler (23 November 1698 in Narva – 1757 in Tallinn) was an Estonian printer who published the first Estonian-language Bible in 1739.

References

1698 births
1757 deaths
People from Narva
17th-century Estonian people
17th-century printers